Dionysius is a Romanized form of the Greek name Dionysios.

Dionysius may also refer to:
 Dionysius the Areopagite, early Christian convert and saint
 Pseudo-Dionysius the Areopagite, a pseudepigraphical Christian theologian and mystic
 Dionysius of Halicarnassus
 Dionysius Exiguus, inventor of the Anno Domini dating system
 Dionysius (album), a 1983 album by jazz drummer Dannie Richmond
 Dionysiou Monastery, an Eastern Orthodox monastery at the monastic state of Mount Athos in Greece
 Dionysia (plant), a plant genus
 Dionysia, a large festival in ancient Athens in honor of the god Dionysus
 Agios Dionyssios, Patras, a neighbourhood in the city of Patras, Greece
 Dionysius (crater), a lunar impact crater
 Dionysius (journal), a classics publication of Dalhousie University
 St Dionysius' Church, Market Harborough, a church of the Church of England, Leicestershire
 St. Dionysius Institute in Paris, an Orthodox Christian theological institute in Paris, France
 Dionysiou Areopagitou Street, a street in Athens
 Codex Athous Dionysiou, a manuscript of the New Testament
 Dionysius, a Greek orator and teacher of Marcus Cornelius Fronto
 Saint Dionysius (disambiguation)
 Dionysius Patrick O'Brien (born 1934), English musician

See also
 Dennis
 Dionysious (disambiguation)
 Dionysos (disambiguation)
 Patriarch Dionysius (disambiguation)
 Dionysius III (disambiguation)
 Dionysus, a Greek god